Benyamin Nikolayevich Kayurov (1876–1936) was a Russian Bolshevik revolutionary.

Kayorov was a working class Bolshevik militant who joined the Russian Social Democratic Labour Party in 1900, and adhering to the Bolshevik faction from 1903. By the time of the February Revolution, he was working in the Ericsson factory in Vyborg, St Petersburg. In his History of the Russian Revolution, Leon Trotsky describes Kayurov's involvement in a demonstration that was shot at by the police during the February Revolution:

When Vladimir Lenin was forced into hiding during the July Days, the first hiding place he used was Kayurov's apartment. During the Russian Civil War, he led a detachment of Petrograd workers on the Kazan Front. He was on the General Staff of the Fifth Army in charge of the political section.

Following his involvement in the Ryutin Affair in 1932, he was expelled from the Communist Party. Then in 1936 he refused to confess to a list of crimes and was shot.

References

Deaths by firearm in Russia
Expelled members of the Communist Party of the Soviet Union
Great Purge victims from Russia
Old Bolsheviks
Russian Social Democratic Labour Party members
Russian revolutionaries
Soviet politicians
1876 births
1936 deaths
Russian socialists
Communist Party of the Soviet Union members
Russian Marxists